Sandro Montefusco (born 2 December 1958) is an Italian yacht racer who competed in the men's 470 class at the 1988 Summer Olympics and the 1992 Summer Olympics.

References

External links
 
 
 

1958 births
Living people
Italian male sailors (sport)
Olympic sailors of Italy
Sailors at the 1988 Summer Olympics – 470
Sailors at the 1992 Summer Olympics – 470
Mediterranean Games gold medalists for Italy